was the lead ship in the two-vessel  of heavy cruisers in the Imperial Japanese Navy. The ship was named after Mount Furutaka, located on Etajima, Hiroshima immediately behind the Imperial Japanese Navy Academy.

Design
Furutaka and her sister ship Kako were the first generation of high speed heavy cruisers in the Japanese navy, intended to counter the American  and British  scout cruisers. They developed the experimental design pioneered in the cruiser . Although there were attempts to minimize weight and protection was only designed to be proof against 6 inch shells, the displacement was seriously overweight.

The two ships were "scout cruisers", designed with aircraft facilities. The lack of catapults, however, necessitated launches from water until a major refit in 1932/3.

Service history

Inter-war period

Furutaka was initially assigned to Cruiser Division 5 where she remained until reduced to reserve in December 1931. Furutaka underwent a series of significant refits in the 1930s. She was reconstructed and modernized at Kure Naval Base in 1932-33, receiving anti-aircraft guns upgraded to 12 cm (4.7 inch), aircraft catapult and an E4N2 floatplane. She was recommissioned into Cruiser Division 6.

Further extensive work started in April 1937. The six single-mount 20 cm (7.9 inch) guns were replaced by three dual mount and re-bored 20.3 cm (8 inch) guns installed in improved mountings (allowing 55° elevation) with two turrets forward and one aft, fire control changed, light anti aircraft weapons augmented and eight new 610 mm (24 inch) Type 93 torpedo tubes were installed. Facilities were upgraded for two E7K2 floatplanes. New oil-fired boilers were installed and there was a general overhaul of machinery. In the light of the added top weight, an attempt was made to maintain stability by increasing the ship's beam - not entirely successfully.

World War II
At the time of the attack on Pearl Harbor, the division was engaged in support for the invasion of Guam.

After the failed first invasion of Wake Cruiser Division 6 was assigned to the larger second invasion force, and after the fall of Wake, returned to its forward base in Truk, Caroline Islands.

From 18 January 1942, Cruiser Division 6 was assigned to support Japanese troop landings at Rabaul, New Britain and Kavieng, New Ireland and in patrols around the Marshall Islands in unsuccessful pursuit of the American fleet. In March–April, Cruiser Division 6 provided support to Cruiser Division 18 in covering the landings of Japanese troops in the Solomon Islands and New Guinea at Buka, Shortland, Kieta, Manus Island, Admiralty Islands and Tulagi from a forward base at Rabaul. While at Shortland on 6 May 1942, Furutaka was attacked by four Boeing B-17 Flying Fortresses, but was not damaged.

Battle of the Coral Sea

At the Battle of the Coral Sea, Cruiser Division 6 departed Shortland and effected a rendezvous at sea with light aircraft carrier .

The following day, 46 SBDs, 21 TBDs and 15 Grumman F4F Wildcats from Yorktown and Lexington damaged the aircraft carrier  severely above the waterline and forced her to return to Japan for extensive repairs. Furutaka and Kinugasa, undamaged in the battle, escorted Shōkaku back to Truk.

Furutaka returned to Kure on 5 June for repairs, and returned to Truk on 7 July. In a major reorganization of the Japanese navy on 14 July, Furutaka was assigned to the newly created Eighth Fleet under Vice Admiral Gunichi Mikawa and was assigned to patrols around the Solomon Islands, New Britain and New Ireland.

Battle of Savo Island

At about 23:00, Chōkai, Furutaka and Kako all launched their reconnaissance floatplanes. The circling floatplanes dropped flares illuminating the targets and all the Japanese ships opened fire. On the Japanese side, Chōkai was hit three times, Kinugasa twice, Aoba once and Furutaka was not damaged and returned to Kavieng on 10 August.

During the Battle of the Eastern Solomons in late August, Cruiser Division 6 and Chōkai departed Shortland to provide distant cover for the Guadalcanal reinforcement convoys. That same day, a Consolidated PBY Catalina of VP23's "Black Cats" unsuccessfully attacked Furutaka in daylight. Furutaka shuttled between Kieta and Rabaul as needed to refuel and resupply through mid-September. The submarine  attacked Furutaka south of New Ireland on 12 September, but did no damage.

Battle of Cape Esperance

 
At 22:35, Helenas radar spotted the Japanese fleet, and the Americans successfully crossed the Japanese "T". Both fleets opened fire, but Admiral Goto, thinking that he was under friendly fire, ordered a 180-degree turn that exposed each of his ships to the American broadsides. Aoba was damaged heavily, and Admiral Goto was mortally wounded on her bridge. With Aoba crippled, Captain Araki of Furutaka turned his ship out of the line of battle to engage Salt Lake City. Destroyer  launched two torpedoes toward Furutaka that either missed or failed to detonate. Duncan continued firing at Furutaka until she was put out of action by numerous shell hits. At 23:54, Furutaka was hit by a torpedo that flooded her forward engine room. During the battle, about 90 shells hit Furutaka and some ignited her Type 93 "Long Lance" torpedoes, starting fires.

Thirty-three crewmen were killed and 110 were later counted as missing. The Americans took 115 of Furutakas crew as prisoners of war, including her Operations Officer, LtCdr. Shotaro Matsui. Most of these surviving crew were imprisoned at the Featherston prisoner of war camp in New Zealand.

Furutaka was removed from navy list on 10 November 1942.

Wreck
The ship rests in two pieces with the bow broken off and lying on its port side and the rest of the ship sitting upright.

References

Sources

External links

  
Tabular record:  CombinedFleet.com: Furutaka history (Retrieved 4 April 2016.)
Gallery: US Navy Historical Center

Furutaka-class cruisers
Ships built by Mitsubishi Heavy Industries
1925 ships
World War II cruisers of Japan
Shipwrecks in Ironbottom Sound
Maritime incidents in October 1942
Shipwreck discoveries by Paul Allen
2019 archaeological discoveries